Introduce Yourself is Faith No More's second studio album, released in 1987. Due to the limited availability of the first album, We Care a Lot (until it was re-released on CD years later), many, including the band, once considered this Faith No More's true debut album. Being the group's major label debut, this album features better production than its predecessor, which is most evident on this album's version of the song "We Care a Lot," which also features updated, more topical, lyrics. It was the last album Chuck Mosley appeared on with the band.

Background
Faith No More's debut album We Care a Lot was released in 1985 through independent label Mordam Records. In late 1986, Faith No More was signed to Los Angeles label Slash Records by Anna Statman. The label had recently been sold to the Warner Music Group subsidiary London Records, ensuring a widespread release, distribution and marketing for the band's forthcoming album.

"We Care A Lot" and "Chinese Arithmetic" were released as radio singles in the fall of 1987, in promotion of the band's tour with Red Hot Chili Peppers. Music videos were later made for the songs "We Care a Lot" (released in January 1988) and "Anne's Song" released (released in May 1988).

Songs
The title track was originally called "The Cheerleader Song". It was written on Faith No More's first nationwide tour of the United States in 1986, as they were on their way from South Dakota to Portland, Oregon, and driving through Missoula, Montana. Keyboardist Roddy Bottum became inspired to write the song when the band went to a truck stop for coffee. He came up with the lyrics on the next leg of the journey, while sitting in the passenger seat of the band's Dodge.

Regarding the song "Death March", singer Chuck Mosley said in 1988, "A friend of mine, doing a lot of drugs, just went out in the ocean and drowned. I used to be on the beach all the time and I got the feeling that he was so fucked up when he drowned that he doesn't even realise he's dead. He's out there, still swimming around. 'Death March' is someone talking to their dead lover, the soul lingering on."

Unlike with the band's prior release We Care a Lot, much of the album has been played regularly with Mosley's replacement, Mike Patton. However, there is only one known performance of "Faster Disco" with Patton on vocals, at a 1990 concert in Kaiserslautern, Germany. "Anne's Song" is one of three Mosley songs to have never been sung live by Patton, with the others being "Arabian Disco" and "New Beginnings", both from We Care a Lot.

Touring and promotion
After the album's release, Faith No More joined fellow funk metal/punk band Red Hot Chili Peppers on The Uplift Mofo Party Tour. Faith No More opened for the Red Hot Chili Peppers during the first two and a half months of the North American tour. Guitarist Jim Martin recalled: "We were travelling in a box van with no windows. We drove all the way to the east coast for the first show. Flea asked me if we liked to smoke weed. I said: ‘Yes’ and he said: ‘We're going to get along just fine’. We did something like 52 dates in 56 days." The band's future singer Mike Patton later became involved in several controversies and disputes with Anthony Kiedis, frontman of the Red Hot Chili Peppers. To further promote the album, Faith No More embarked on their first tour of the UK in 1988.

Release history

The album was originally released in April 1987 on vinyl and cassette. The album cover for this release is a centered ink splatter, with text to the extremes of the cover. The tape has a larger smear of the ink that looks more like a green spot. Bassist Billy Gould's initial idea was a red splatter, but the color was then changed at the request of the record label. The second release of this album was on November 15, 1996, through Slash/Uni Records, and also featured the centered ink splatter. The last North American release of this album was on October 17, 2000, through Slash/Rhino Records; they later released This Is It: The Best of Faith No More in 2003. This version has a close-up of the ink splatter with the wording a bit further from the edges.

Reception
The record has garnered positive reviews from music critics, although as with the band's previous studio effort We Care a Lot, some criticisms have been directed at vocalist Chuck Mosley. AllMusic stated that "the album is consistent and interesting, with Mosley's out-of-tune vocals being an acquired taste to most". In 1988, Neil Perry of Sounds Magazine referred to the album as "a breathtaking harmonisation of molten metal guitar, deadly dance rhythms and poignant, pointed lyrics".

Legacy
Producer Matt Wallace claimed it was an "overlooked FNM record" in 2016.

Louder Sound wrote in 2020, "Introduce Yourself is an irresistibly charming record [...] In the same way that Paul Di'Anno’s voice on early Iron Maiden sounds lovably rugged when contrasted with their slick later work, Chuck Mosely’s goofy, purposefully-underachieving vocals smother these songs in a huge dollop of infectious playfulness – something that Patton’s studied delivery could never quite emulate."

While Mike Patton dismissed the band's debut We Care a Lot as "bad hippie music", he has admitted to having a fondness for Introduce Yourself.

Track listing

Personnel
Band members
Mike Bordin – drums, congas, backing vocals
Roddy Bottum – keyboards, backing vocals
Billy Gould – bass, backing vocals
Jim Martin – guitar, backing vocals
Chuck Mosley – lead vocals

Production
Steve Berlin – producer
Matt Wallace – producer, engineer
Jim "Watts" Verecke – assistant engineer
John Golden – mastering
Lendon Flanagan – photography
Bob Biggs – artwork
Jeff Price – artwork

Accolades

Footnotes

1987 albums
Albums produced by Matt Wallace
Faith No More albums
Funk metal albums
Rap metal albums
Slash Records albums